The following is a list of events and new music that happened in 2021 in the Latin music industry. Latin regions include Ibero-America, Spain, Portugal, and the United States.

Events

January–March 

 February 18 – The 33rd Annual Lo Nuestro Awards are held at the American Airlines Arena in Miami, Florida.
 YHLQMDLG by Bad Bunny wins Album of the Year.
 "Tusa" by Karol G and Nicki Minaj wins Song of the Year
 Nicki Nicole and Camilo win New Female Artist and New Male Artist, respectively
March 2Journalist Leila Cobo publishes La Fórmula "Despacito": Los Hits de la Música Latina Contados por sus Artistas. 

 March 10The 2nd Annual Premios Odeón take place virtually from Madrid.
 David Bisbal wins Best Pop Album for En Tus Planes.
 Posible by Enrique Bunbury wins Best Rock Album.
 Back to Rookport by Kid Keo takes the award for Best Urban Album.
 Amor by Israel Fernández and Diego Del Morao wins Best Flamenco Album.
 De Vent i Ales by Txarango wins the award for Best Alternative Album.
 March 12Revelación, the first Spanish-language project by Selena Gomez, is released. It debuted at number 22 on the US Billboard 200, shifting 23,000 equivalent album units in its first week of release, marking the biggest sales week for a Latin album by a woman since Shakira's El Dorado in 2017. It also debuted atop the Billboard Top Latin Albums chart, becoming the first album by a woman to do so, also since El Dorado.
 March 14The 63rd Grammy Awards are held at Los Angeles Convention Center in Los Angeles, California.
 Bad Bunny receives his first ever Grammy Award by winning Best Latin Pop or Urban Album for YHLQMDLG.
 Fito Páez also wins his first Grammy Award by winning Best Latin Rock or Alternative Album for La Conquista del Espacio.
 Natalia Lafourcade receives her second career Grammy Award by winning Best Regional Mexican Music Album (including Tejano) for Un Canto Por México, Vol. 1.
 Grupo Niche's 40 wins Best Tropical Latin Album.

April–June 

 April 15The Latin American Music Awards of 2021 take place at BB&T Center in Sunrise, Florida.
 Bad Bunny wins a total of five awards including Artist of the Year, Favorite Male Artist and Album of the Year for YHLQMDLG.
 Anitta wins Favorite Female Artist
 Rauw Alejandro wins New Artist of the Year
 "De Una Vez" by Selena Gomez wins Favorite Video
 April 30The Recording Academy drop anonymous nominating committees after controversies surrounding previous Grammy Award ceremonies but remain in-place for Latin Grammys. Urbano music receives its own category at the Grammys named Best Música Urbana Album, expanding to five the Latin categories within future galas.
May 4The Latin Alternative Music Conference takes place in New York City.
 May 9The Latin Recording Academy present Ellas y Su Música to celebrate the experience of women in music with a television special.
May 17The Premios Nuestra Tierra 2021 take place virtually from Bogotá to celebrate the best in Colombian music.
Camilo wins Artist of the Year.
Colores by J Balvin wins Album of the Year.
"Hawái" by Maluma wins Song of the Year.
Kali Uchis wins Best New Artist.
May 19Balearic group Antònia Font announce their reunion concert after an eight-year hiatus, scheduled for June 11, 2022 at Primavera Sound.
 May 23The 28th Annual Billboard Music Awards are held at Microsoft Theater in Los Angeles, California.
 Bad Bunny wins Top Latin Artist.
 YHLQMDLG by Bad Bunny wins Top Latin Album.
 "Dakiti" by Bad Bunny and Jhay Cortez wins Top Latin Song.
May 25Spanish hip hop supergroup La Mafia del Amor announce their reunion concert, scheduled for June 11, 2022 at Primavera Sound.

 May 27 – The 8th iHeartRadio Music Awards are held at the Dolby Theatre in Los Angeles, California.
 J Balvin wins Latin Artist of the Year.
 YHLQMDLG by Bad Bunny wins Latin Album of the Year.
 "Tusa" by Karol G and Nicki Minaj wins Latin Song of the Year.
 Rauw Alejandro wins Best New Latin Artist.
June 9The 5th Premios Pulsar take place live from a studio in Santiago to celebrate the best in Chilean music.
 Cami wins Artist of the Year.
 Naturaleza Muerta by Como Asesinar a Felipes wins Album of the Year.
 "Flotando" by Francisca Valenzuela wins Song of the Year.
 Pau wins Best New Artist.

July–September 

 July 1The 5th Heat Latin Music Awards take place in Dominican Republic.
 Nicky Jam wins Best Male Artist
 Danna Paola wins Best Female Artist
 "Mi Niña (Remix)" by Wisin, Myke Towers and Maluma featuring Anitta wins Best Video
 "Ella No Es Tuya" by Rochy RD, Myke Towers and Nicki Nicole wins Best Collaboration
 Boza wins Best New Artist

July 23The 23rd Annual Premios Gardel take place live from a studio in Buenos Aires to celebrate the best in Argentinian music.
La Conquista del Espacio by Fito Páez wins Album of the Year.
"Ladrón" by Lali featuring Cazzu wins Song of the Year.
"Buenos Aires" by Nathy Peluso wins Record of the Year.
Nathy Peluso wins Best New Artist and becomes the most awarded act of the night after also winning Best Alternative Pop Album for Calambre and Best Urban/Trap Song for "Bzrp Music Sessions, Vol. 36".
August 1Gabriel Abaroa steps down as the CEO of the Latin Recording Academy, with Manuel Abud taking his place. Abaroa is named president emeritus.
September 12 – "Lo Vas a Olvidar" by Billie Eilish and Rosalía wins Best Latin at the 2021 MTV Video Music Awards.
September 23 – The 28th Billboard Latin Music Awards take place at Watsco Center in Coral Gables, Florida.
Bad Bunny wins Artist of the Year.
Myke Towers wins New Artist of the Year.

October–December 

 October 18 – Billboard celebrates the 2021 Latin Power Players event in Miami with more than 65 executives representing top music companies.
 October 22 – El Alfa becomes the first dembow artist to sell out Madison Square Garden.
 November 8 – Spotify launches a new campaign titled Elevando Nuestra Música around the platform's flagship Latin music playlist, Viva Latino.
 November 12 – The 16th LOS40 Music Awards take place at Velòdrom Illes Balears in Palma de Mallorca.
 Vértigo by Pablo Alborán wins Best Spanish Album.
 "Portales" by Dani Martín wins Best Spanish Song.
 Sebastián Yatra wins Best Latin Artist.
 "Todo de Ti" by Rauw Alejandro wins Best Latin Song.
 November 14 – The 28th MTV Europe Music Awards air on MTV live from Budapest.
 Maluma wins Best Lati
 Manu Gavassi wins Best Brazilian Act.
 Alemán wins Best Latin America North Act.
 Sebastián Yatra wins Best Latin America Central Act.
 Tini wins Best Latin America South Act.
 Diogo Piçarra wins Best Portuguese Act.
 Aitana wins Best Spanish Act.
 November 18 – The 22nd Annual Latin Grammy Awards take place at MGM Grand Garden Arena in Las Vegas.
 Salswing! by Rubén Blades and Roberto Delgado & Orquesta wins Album of the Year.
 "Talvez" by Caetano Veloso and Tom Veloso wins Record of the Year.
 "Patria y Vida" by Yotuel, Gente de Zona, Descemer Bueno, Maykel Osorbo and El Funky wins Song of the Year.
 Juliana Velásquez wins Best New Artist.
 Camilo becomes the most awarded act of the night, winning four out of ten nominations.
 December 19 – Aventura's reunion tour finalizes at the Olympic Stadium in Santo Domingo.

Number-one albums and singles by country
List of Billboard Argentina Hot 100 number-one singles of 2021
List of number-one albums of 2021 (Portugal)
List of number-one albums of 2021 (Spain)
List of number-one singles of 2021 (Spain)
List of number-one Billboard Latin Albums from the 2020s
List of Billboard number-one Latin songs of 2021

Awards

Latin music awards
33rd Lo Nuestro Awards
2021 Billboard Latin Music Awards
2021 Latin American Music Awards
2021 Latin Grammy Awards
2021 Heat Latin Music Awards
2021 MTV Millennial Awards

Awards with Latin categories
28th Billboard Music Awards
63rd Grammy Awards
8th iHeartRadio Music Awards
16th Los40 Music Awards
38th MTV Video Music Awards
23rd Teen Choice Awards
2nd Premios Odeón

Spanish- and Portuguese-language songs on the Billboard Global 200 
The Billboard Global 200 is a weekly record chart published by Billboard magazine that ranks the top songs globally based on digital sales and online streaming from over 200 territories worldwide. So far, in 2021, a total of 14 Spanish- and Portuguese-language songs have debuted in the Billboard Global 200.

Spanish-language songs on the Billboard Hot 100
The Billboard Hot 100 ranks the most-played songs in the United States based on sales (physical and digital), radio play, and online streaming. Also included are certifications awarded by the Recording Industry Association of America (RIAA) based on digital downloads and on-demand audio and/or video song streams: gold certification is awarded for sales of 500,000 copies, platinum for one million units, and multi-platinum for two million units, and following in increments of one million thereafter. The RIAA also awards Spanish-language songs under the Latin certification: Disco de Oro (Gold) is awarded for sales 30,000 certification copies, Disco de Platino (Platinum) for 60,000 units, and Disco de Multi-Platino (Multi-Platinum) for 120,000 units, and following in increments of 60,000 thereafter. So far, in 2021, four Spanish-language songs have debuted in the Billboard Hot 100.

Albums released 
The following is a list of notable Latin albums (music performed in Spanish or Portuguese)  that have been released in Latin America, Spain, Portugal, or the United States in 2021.

First quarter

January

February

March

Second quarter

April

May

June

Second quarter

Third quarter

July

August

September

Fourth quarter

October

November

December

Year-End

Performance in the United States

Albums
The following is a list of the 10 best-performing Latin albums in the United States  according to Billboard and Nielsen SoundScan, which compiles data from traditional sales and album-equivalent units. Equivalent album units are based on album sales, track equivalent albums (10 tracks sold equals one album sale), and streaming equivalent albums (3,750 ad-supported streams or 1,250 paid subscription streams equals one album sale).

Songs
The following is a list of the 10 best-performing Latin songs in the United States  according to Billboard and Nielsen SoundScan, which compiles data from streaming activity, digital sales and radio airplay.

Airplay in Latin America
The following is a list of the 10 most-played radio songs in Latin America in the tracking period of January 1, 2021 through November 28, 2021, according to Monitor Latino.

The following is a list of the 10 most-heard radio songs in Latin America in the tracking period of January 1, 2021 through November 28, 2021, according to Monitor Latino.

Deaths 
January 1 - Carlos do Carmo, Portuguese fado singer and recipient of the Latin Grammy Lifetime Achievement Award in 2014, 81
January 7 - Genival Lacerda, Brazilian forró singer-songwriter, 89
January 28 - César Isella, Argentine singer-songwriter, 82
February 5 - Jaime Murrell, Panamanian singer, 71
February 27 - Gipsy Bonafina, Argentine actress and singer, 63
February 28 - Jorge Oñate, Colombian vallenato singer, 71 (COVID-19)
March 11 - Florentín Giménez, Paraguayan pianist and composer, 95
April 3 – Agnaldo Timóteo, Brazilian singer, composer and politician, 84 (COVID-19)
April 19 – Dedim Gouveia, Brazilian forró singer, 61 (COVID-19)
May 7 – Cassiano, Brazilian singer and composer, 77 (COVID-19)
May 17 – MC Kevin, Brazilian singer, 23
September 21 
 La Prieta Linda (Enriqueta "Queta" Jiménez Chabolla), Mexican singer and actress, 88
 Roberto Roena, Puerto Rican salsa percussionist and bandleader, 81
November 1 
Nelson Freire, Brazilian classical pianist, 77
Gilberto Grácio, Portuguese guitar maker, 85
November 5 – Marília Mendonça, Brazilian singer and Grammy winner (2019), 26 (air crash)
December 6 – Hector Emaides, Argentinian music and festival producer (Cosquin Rock), 66 (pneumonia)
December 11 – , Brazilian sambista (Portela), 88
December 12 – Vicente Fernández, Mexican singer and actor, multiple Grammy Award winner, 81

References

 
Latin music by year